The Shire of Pioneer was a local government area surrounding the city of Mackay and including all but its innermost suburbs.

History

The Borough of Mackay was proclaimed on 22 September 1869 under the Municipal Institutions Act 1864.
Pioneer Division was one of the 74 divisional boards established on 11 November 1879 under the Divisional Boards Act 1879 with a population of 2884 and covered the region surrounding but not including the Borough of Mackay.

With the passage of the Local Authorities Act 1902, Pioneer Division became the Shire of Pioneer on 31 March 1903. The Pioneer Shire Council Chambers at 1 Wood Street, Mackay, were constructed in 1935 and are now listed on the Queensland Heritage Register.

The Shire of Sarina was established from the southern part of the Shire of Pioneer on 1 January 1912 under the Local Authorities Act 1902.

The Shire of Mirani was established from part of the Shire of Pioneer on 4 September 1913 under the Local Authorities Act 1902.

On 21 November 1991, the Electoral and Administrative Review Commission, created two years earlier, produced its second report, and recommended that local government boundaries in the Mackay area be rationalised. The Local Government (Mackay and Pioneer) Regulation 1993 was gazetted on 17 December 1993, and on 30 March 1994, the Shire ceased to exist and was amalgamated with City of Mackay. Gordon White, who had served as chairman of Pioneer since 1983, won the resulting mayoral elections and was then mayor of the City of Mackay until 1994.

Towns and localities

Suburbs:

 Andergrove
 Beaconsfield
 Blacks Beach
 Bucasia
 Cremorne
 Dolphin Heads
 Eimeo
 Erakala
 Foulden
 Glenella
 Mackay Harbour
 Mount Pleasant
 Nindaroo
 North Mackay
 Ooralea
 Paget
 Racecourse
 Richmond
 Rural View
 Shoal Point
 Slade Point

Towns:
 Bakers Creek
 Ball Bay
 Brampton Island
 Calen
 Farleigh
 Halliday Bay
 Hampden
 Kuttabul
 Laguna Quays
 Lindeman Island
 McEwens Beach
 Midge Point
 Mount Ossa
 Oakenden
 Pindi Pindi
 Seaforth
 St Helens Beach
 Walkerston

National Parks:
 Cape Hillsborough NP
 Eungella NP
 Mount Jukes NP
 Mount Martin NP
 Mount Ossa NP
 Pioneer Peaks NP
 Reliance Creek NP

Other localities:
 Alexandra
 Balberra
 Balnagowan
 Belmunda
 Bloomsbury
 Chelona
 Dumbleton
 Dunnrock
 Greenmount
 Habana
 Homebush
 Mentmore
 Mount Charlton
 Mount Pelion
 Munbura
 Palmyra
 Pleystowe
 Rosella
 Sandiford
 Sunnyside
 Te Kowai
 The Leap
 Victoria Plains
 Yalboroo

Chairmen
 1885-1890:Walter Paget
 1901: Walter Paget
 1927: William Henry Kirkup 
 1934-1947: Ernie Evans
 1955-1957: Ernie Evans
 1983-1994: Gordon White, who continued as mayor of City of Mackay after the amgalmation until 1999.

Population

References

External links
 Local Government (Mackay and Pioneer) Regulation 1993

 
Former local government areas of Queensland
1879 establishments in Australia
1994 disestablishments in Australia